San Juan de Dios Hospital may refer to:

 San Juan de Dios Hospital (Granada), Spain
 San Juan de Dios Educational Foundation, Pasay, Philippines
 San Juan de Dios Hospital (Santiago), Chile
 San Juan de Dios Hospital (Quito), Ecuador